NCR Country Club is a country club located in Dayton, Ohio where NCR Corporation used to be headquartered. There are two golf courses at the club, the North course and the South course. The 1969 PGA Championship was played on the South course and won by Raymond Floyd. It also hosted the 2005 U.S. Senior Open won by Allen Doyle and the 1986 U.S. Women's Open, which was won by Jane Geddes

Tournaments hosted 

 2022 U.S. Senior Women's Open
 2005 U.S. Senior Open
 1986 U.S. Women's Open
 1969 PGA Championship

External links
 NCR Country Club official website
 Review from Sports Network

Golf clubs and courses in Ohio
Buildings and structures in Montgomery County, Ohio
NCR Corporation
Tourist attractions in Montgomery County, Ohio
1954 establishments in Ohio
Sports venues completed in 1954